Motor City Patrol is a top-down driving game released in 1992 for the Nintendo Entertainment System. It was developed by British studio Source Research & Development and published by Matchbox International Ltd.

Motor City Patrol was shown at the Summer Consumer Electronics Show in 1990 and 1991. The game was released in January 1992, and was Matchbox's first video game.

Motor City Patrol was one in a line of video games that tied into the Matchbox brand of die-cast model vehicles, like police cars, ambulances, fire trucks, and earth-moving construction machines.

Gameplay

The player controls an officer of the law whose job it is to patrol one of five precincts for a week at a time.  As the player gets farther and farther into the week, a larger area is permitted to be patrolled, in addition to a longer shift (time limit) to accomplish each of the mission goals.

Players get to drive around all day looking for speeders, robbers, and public enemies, while avoiding hurting innocent civilians. When a criminal (speeder, robber, or public enemy) appears on the precinct map, the player must either pull over or shoot the offender's vehicle.  The game ends when players fail in a mission, receive five or more warnings, shoot a civilian, or total their vehicle.

After going through all five precincts (at seven days apiece), players start over again in precinct 1, on day 1, with all of their points, merits, warnings, and car upgrades intact. The game cycles indefinitely until the player loses.

Reception
Skyler Miller of AllGame gave Motor City Patrol two stars out of a possible five, calling it an "interesting but ultimately disappointing game". Miller praised the game's "sharp, detailed rendition" of city streets, but wrote that the execution of the game's "promising" concept "is derailed by repetitive objectives that never change, a difficult-to-control car and the necessity of constantly having to switch to a map screen to see the location of buildings and criminals."

References

External links
Motor City Patrol at MobyGames

1992 video games
Nintendo Entertainment System games
Nintendo Entertainment System-only games
North America-exclusive video games
Racing video games
Top-down video games
Video games about police officers
Video games developed in the United Kingdom